Günther Lütjens (1889–1941) was a German admiral best known for commanding the sortie of the battleship Bismarck in World War II.

Lutjens or Lütjens may also refer to:
German destroyer Lütjens
Lütjens-class destroyer, a class of destroyers of the German Navy

People with the surname
Guus Lutjens (1884–1974), Dutch footballer

See also
Lutyens (disambiguation)
Luyten (disambiguation)